The Agronomy Barn Seed House, located on the Agronomy Research Station of Oklahoma State University,  was built in 1934.  It is a brick, concrete, frame barn, measuring 108 feet long, 44 feet wide, and 37 feet 9 inches high, and is distinguished by a large gambrel roof. The ground floor as well as the loft is concrete. In design it is very typical of barns of the period. The barn was designed and constructed by Oklahoma State University students, architects, professors, and engineers.

References

Barns on the National Register of Historic Places in Oklahoma
Buildings and structures completed in 1934
Payne County, Oklahoma
University and college buildings on the National Register of Historic Places in Oklahoma
Barns in Oklahoma
National Register of Historic Places in Payne County, Oklahoma
1934 establishments in Oklahoma